Cetate Synagogue is a Jewish place of worship in Timișoara, located on Mărășești Street in the Cetate district. It was built between 1863 and 1865 in an eclectic style with Moorish elements. It is inscribed in the list of historical monuments in Timiș County. The synagogue reopened for the public in 2022.

History 
The synagogue was built between 1863 and 1864, with completion works extended until 1865. The construction project was entrusted to the Viennese architect . First Rabbi Mór Hirschfeld had taken the initiative to appeal to members of the community, who donated the necessary funds to purchase two plots near the Judenhof ("Jewish Quarter") from the Janicsáry family and the Piarist college. Ignátz S. Eisenstädter, the cashier and later, between 1870 and 1890, the president of the community, played a key role in the organizing committee under the leadership of Marcus Grünbaum. The construction of the synagogue was done by Lipót Baumhorn, who, in addition to the one in Timișoara, built many other synagogues in Brașov, Rijeka, Budapest, etc., but also some important civil buildings, including in Timișoara. The building was originally called the New Synagogue.

The synagogue was inaugurated on 19 September 1865, at 10 o'clock, one day before the eve of Rosh HaShanah, being re-inaugurated two years later, in 1867, in the presence of Emperor Franz Joseph I of the Austro-Hungarian Empire. The year 1867 is of historical importance in two respects: it is the year of the establishment of the dual monarchy of Austria-Hungary, but also the year of the acquisition of full citizenship by the Jews of the Empire. It served the Jewish neolog community for nearly 140 years.

Due to the decline in the number of Jews leaving for Israel after World War II, the synagogue was closed in 1985. In 2001, the Jewish community of Timișoara ceded the building to the Philharmonic Society for a period of 50 years, to be used as a concert hall. It was reopened for the first time in 20 years in September 2005, when it hosted a concert organized by the Banatul Philharmonic. Currently, the synagogue has returned to the administration of the Federation of Jewish Communities of Romania. Rehabilitation work on the synagogue began in December 2017. The synagogue will again be used as a place of prayer, possibly with a space set up for a museum of Jews of Timișoara.

Architecture 

Cetate Synagogue is one of the most distinctive and original buildings in the city. It has an eclectic style, typical of the second half of the 19th century, with ornaments of Moorish architecture and decorations specific to Judaism. The layout of the building is a central, cruciform one, to which the body of the vestibule, flanked by the two towers of the building, is added to the west. The main facade is built of apparent brick and glazed ceramic tiles. The alternation of the use of two-tone bricks draws geometric motifs on the entire surface of the main facade, but dominated by the large rose window, in which the symbol of the Star of David can be noticed.

The entrance is made through a vestibule (pulish), which has two houses on the sides of the access stairs leading to the lodges reserved for women and to the towers. From the vestibule one enters into a rectangular room (heichal) reserved for men. It has wooden benches carved and covered with a dome on pendants, connected to deep space by four arches. The capacity is about 3,000 people.

References

External links 
 Virtual tour of the synagogue

See also 

 List of synagogues in Romania
 Fabric Synagogue
 Iosefin Synagogue

Neolog Judaism synagogues
Synagogues in Timișoara
Moorish Revival architecture in Romania
Moorish Revival synagogues
Tourist attractions in Timișoara
Historic monuments in Timiș County
Synagogues completed in 1865
Synagogue buildings with domes